Stephen I of Moldavia (Moldavian: Ştefan I), (?1364 – 1399) was Prince of Moldavia from 1394 to 1399. He succeeded to the throne as son of the previous ruler, Roman I and succeeded by his brother Iuga(Yuri) whom he associated to the throne in 1399 when he fell ill.

Stephen I's rule is notable for his victory at Ghindaoani (Neamt County) in February 1395 against king Sigismund I of Hungary who wished to assert his suzerainty over Moldavia (Stephen having had secured the support & agreed to be vassal of king Wladislaw II Jagello of Poland).

Stephen I is buried at Bogdana Monastery in Radauti, Romania next to his father Roman I, grandfather Costea & great-grandfather Bogdan I - the founder of independent Moldavia.

See also

References

Rulers of Moldavia
14th-century rulers in Europe
House of Bogdan-Mușat
Burials at Bogdana Monastery